Panorama Heights may refer to:
Panorama Heights, Alberta, Canada
Panorama Heights, California, United States